Putnam County Airport (GPC), (formerly 4I7), is a public airport  southeast of Greencastle, in Putnam County, Indiana, United States. The airport was founded in January 1947. It is included in the Federal Aviation Administration (FAA) National Plan of Integrated Airport Systems for 2017–2021, in which it is categorized as a local general aviation facility.

Facilities and aircraft 
Putnam County Airport covers an area of 192 acres (78 ha) at an elevation of 842 feet (257 m) above mean sea level. It has one runway:
18/36 is a 5,002 by 100 feet (1,525 X 30 m) asphalt runway with approved GPS.  

For the 12-month period ending December 31, 2013, the airport had 7,309 aircraft operations, an average of 20 per day: 99% general aviation and 1% air taxi. 
In January 2017, there were 34 aircraft based at this airport: 16 single-engine, 5 multi-engine, 8 helicopter and 5 ultralight.

References

External links 

 http://www.airnav.com/airport/GPC

Airports in Indiana
Transportation buildings and structures in Putnam County, Indiana